The Deception River is a river in New Zealand. It passes close to Goat Pass, which gives access to the Mingha River. Almost the entire length of the river is within the Arthur's Pass National Park.

The river was once called "Goat Creek". It was surveyed about 1900 as a possible alternative route for the Midland Line, and the surveyor warned that the water levels could be deceiving. About three months later, a flood from the river into the Otira Valley caused several thousand dollars' worth of damage to the railway, and the river was given its current name.

The Department of Conservation maintains a tramping track alongside the river, and it is part of the annual Coast to Coast race. Backcountry huts are available for trampers; one near Goat Pass and another a little further down the river.

See also
List of rivers of New Zealand

References

Land Information New Zealand - Search for Place Names

Rivers of the West Coast, New Zealand
Westland District
Arthur's Pass National Park
Rivers of New Zealand